The Kumasi Nurses' Training College, now Kumasi Nursing and Midwifery Training College is public tertiary health institution in Kumasi in the Ashanti Region of Ghana.  The college is in the Kumasi Metropolitan Assembly.  The school is located at the premises of the Komfo Anokye Teaching Hospital, Kumasi.

Brief history
Kumasi Nursing and Midwifery Training College was founded in 1957 by the Medical Mission Sisters of the Kumasi Church.
The school offers two Basic Diploma Programs, Nursing and midwifery. Affiliated to the second biggest health facility in the country, the college provides high standard theoretical and clinical coursework in all the aspects of diploma standard general nursing and midwifery. The activities of the institution is supervised by the Ministry of Health. The college now awards direct diploma Diploma in Nursing and Midwifery after students from the institution have successfully completed a three-year training programme. The institution is accredited by the National Accreditation Board. The Nurses and Midwifery Council (NMC) is the main body that regulates the activities, curriculum and examination of the school. The council's mandate Is enshrined under section 4(1) of N.R.C.D 117.

Academic programmes
The programmes offered in this institution are divided into three:
Basic programmes
Post basic programmes
Certificate programmes

Basic programmes
Registered General nurse (RGN) Diploma
Registered Mental Nurse (RMN) Diploma
Registered Midwifery (RM) Diploma (females only)
Registered Community Health Nurse (RCHN) Diploma
Technical Officer Community Health, (Nutrition option) Diploma
Technical Officer Community Health, (Disease control) Diploma
Technical Officer Health Information, Diploma
Technical Officer Medical Laboratory Technology, Diploma
Technical Officer Environmental Health, Diploma
Technical Officer Oral Health, Diploma
Diploma in Community Medicine (Medical Assistants) Diploma
Certificate in Community Health Nursing,(CHN)
Certificate in Environmental Health (Environmental Health Assistants)
Certificate in Community Health (Field Technicians)
Certificate in Clinical Health Care (Health Assistants Clinical)
Certificate in Clinical Health Care (Reproductive Health Option) females only
Physiotherapy (Certificate)
Certificate in Medical Laboratory

Post basic programmes
Community (Medical Assistants) Kintampo
Ophthalmic Nursing – Korle-bu
Peri- Operative Nursing – Korle-bu
ENT Nursing – Korle-bu
Public Health Nursing – Korle-bu
Critical Care Nursing – Korle-bu
Nurse Anesthesiology – Kumasi
Community Oral Health – Kintampo

Certificate programmes
Certificate in Community Health Nursing
Certificate in Environmental Health (Environmental Health Assistants)
Certificate in Community Health (Field Technicians)
Certificate in Clinical Health Care (Health Assistants)

References

Nursing and midwifery colleges in Ghana